Cyril Drummond Le Gros Clark ('C. D.') (1894 – 6 July 1945), brother of Wilfrid Le Gros Clark, was a translator of Su Shi from Chinese into English, and Chief Secretary of Sarawak.  After marrying Averil Mackenzie-Grieve in 1925. In preparation for his Secretaryship he spent from 1925 to 1927  on Gulangyu Island, at the time an extraterritorial International Settlement in order to learn Hokkien language and culture. At the end of 1931 his "Selections from the Works Su Tung-t'o" was published. The book was decorated by wood engravings of his wife. The Yorkshire Post and Leeds Intelligencer praised the translation for its "gracefully natural prose."

On 31 March 1941 he announced the decision of the Rajah of Sarawak, Charles Vyner Brooke,  to introduce a democratic constitution.
After the Japanese invasion of Sarawak in December 1941 Le Gros Clark was captured and held in Batu Lintang camp. From July 1942 until 14 November 1944 he served as the camp master. He was executed two months before the end of World War II.

Bibliography

 Selections from the Works of Su-Tung-P'O (A.D. 1036–1101), 1953, 
 Sarawak: 1935 Blue Report

Further reading
Ooi, Keat Gin (1998) Japanese Empire in the Tropics: Selected Documents and Reports of the Japanese Period in Sarawak, Northwest Borneo, 1941–1945 Ohio University Center for International Studies, Monographs in International Studies, SE Asia Series 101 (2 vols)

References

History of Sarawak
Recipients of the Order of the Star of Sarawak
Internees at Batu Lintang camp
1894 births
1945 deaths
British people who died in Japanese internment camps
People executed by Japanese occupation forces
British people in colonial Sarawak